The Cat in the Hat Comes Back is a 1958 children's book written and illustrated by Dr. Seuss and published by Random House. In this book, a sequel to The Cat in the Hat (1957), the chaos-causing title character leaves a pink stain in the family bathtub, which spreads around the house as the children try to get rid of it, until the cat unveils a series of increasingly small cats from beneath his hat, the smallest of which resolves the problem.

Plot 

Once again, an unnamed boy who narrates the story and his sister Sally are being left home alone for the day. This time, their mother has left them with instructions to clear away a large amount of snow while she is out. However, they are soon interrupted in their work by the return of the Cat in the Hat. The boy is warned by Sally not to talk to the Cat nor to let him come near, reminding him of what happened the last time he came. However, the Cat lets himself into their house to get out of the snow, and the boy follows him in. When he reaches the bathroom, he finds the Cat eating a cake in the tub with the hot and cold water on. The boy (who loses his patience) scolds the Cat for his antics, telling the Cat there is work to be done, and he should not be in the house eating cake like a pig. He tells the Cat that he should get out of the house unless he helps out with the work. Then he turns off the water and drains out (unplugs) the tub, only to find that a long ring of pink cake icing has formed around the sides of the bath tub. The Cat offers to help clean it up, but his preliminary attempts to remove the pink spot end in disaster as he only transfers the mess to a succession of one object after another, including their mother's white dress, the wall, their father's pair of $10 shoes (worth $94.66 when adjusted for inflation in 2021, and written as £7 when published in the United Kingdom), a rug, and their parents' bed. Unsure of how to remove the stain from the bed, the Cat calls on the help of Little Cat A, who lives inside his hat, who lifts his hat to reveal Little Cat B, and then Little Cat C. The three Little Cats go to work, transferring the stain to the television, then a pan, and finally outside with a fan.

Seeing the spot cover the snow, Little Cat C lifts his hat to reveal Little Cats D to G. The seven Little Cats wage war on the snow spots, shooting at pink snowballs with pop guns. This spreads the spots even more, so Little Cat G lifts his hat to reveal Little Cats H to V. But the harder the cats work, the more the spot keeps spreading, until all the snow is pink, so Little Cat V takes off his hat to uncover Little Cats W, X, Y and the microscopic Little Cat Z. Z takes his hat off and unleashes a "Voom", which finally cleans up the spot, clears all the snow from the paths, and puts all the Little Cats back into the Big Cat's hat. The Cat leaves, with the promise that he and the Little Cats, A through Z, will return someday if they ever again have problems like "snow spots" (maybe starting the next day for starters if there is still a problem).

The book ends in a burst of flamboyant versification, with the full list of little cats arranged into a metrically perfect rhymed quatrain, reciting the alphabet.

Cancelled film
Following the 2003 film adaption of the original story, there were plans to make a sequel based on The Cat in the Hat Comes Back. But after the film was a critical failure, Theodor Geisel's widow Audrey Geisel decided not to allow any future live-action adaptations of her husband's works.

References

Sources
 
 
 

Books by Dr. Seuss
Books about cats
1958 children's books
Sequel books
Random House books
The Cat in the Hat